The All-Ukrainian Union of Workers' Solidarity "VOLYA" is a trade union representing Catholic workers in Ukraine.

The union was established in 1989 and affiliated to the World Confederation of Labour.  By the end of the 1990s, it claimed a membership of 50,000.  In 2013/2014, it took part in the Euromaidan movement.

References

Christian trade unions
Trade unions established in 1989
Trade unions in Ukraine